James Cerretani and David Škoch were the defending champions but decided not to participate.

Marco Crugnola and Rubén Ramírez Hidalgo won the tournament. They defeated Jan Mertl and Matwé Middelkoop 7–6(7–3), 3–6, [10–8] in the final.

Seeds

Draw

Draw

References
 Main Draw

Banja Luka Challenger - Doubles
2011 Doubles